This article lists the Ulster Unionist Party's election results in UK parliamentary elections.

Summary of general election performance

Election results

1922 general election

1923 general election

1924 general election

By-elections, 1924–1929

1929 general election

1931 general election

1935 general election

By-elections, 1935–1945

1945 general election

By-elections, 1945–1950

1950 general election

By-elections, 1950–1951

1951 general election

By-elections, 1951–1955

1955 general election

Although Grosvenor failed to win Fermanagh and South Tyrone, he was declared elected after the winning candidate was found to be ineligible.

By-elections, 1955–1959

Although Beattie failed to win Mid Ulster, he was declared elected after the winning candidate was found to be ineligible, but was then in turn disqualified as ineligible.  A new by-election was held, which the Ulster Unionist Party did not contest.

1959 general election

By-elections, 1959–1964

1964 general election

1966 general election

By-elections, 1966–1970

1970 general election

February 1974 general election

October 1974 general election

1979 general election

By-elections, 1979–1983

1983 general election

By-elections, 1983–1987

1987 general election

By-elections, 1987–1992

1992 general election

By-elections, 1992–1997

1997 general election

By-elections, 1997–2001

2001 general election

2005 general election

2010 general election

Candidates stood as part of Ulster Conservatives and Unionists - New Force.

By-elections, 2010–2015

2015 general election

2017 general election

By-elections, 2017–2019

2019 general election

References

F. W. S. Craig, Chronology of British Parliamentary By-elections 1833-1987
UK General election results February 1974, Richard Kimber's Political Resources
UK General election results October 1974, Richard Kimber's Political Resources
UK General election results May 1979, Richard Kimber's Political Resources

Ulster Unionist Party
Election results by party in the United Kingdom